Cecil Brown may refer to:

Cecil Brown (journalist) (1907–1987), American war correspondent
Cecil Brown (writer) (born 1943), American novelist
Cecil Valentine Brown (1845–1875), British chess player
Cecil B. Brown Jr. (1926–2006), American activist, businessman, and legislator
Cecil Brown (Mississippi politician) (born 1944), American politician and member of the Mississippi House of Representatives
Cecil Brown (cricketer) (1895–1955), English cricketer
Cecil Brown (architect) (1902–1983), restoration architect of St Lawrence Jewry and other churches destroyed in the London blitz
Cecil Brown (Hawaii politician) (1850–1917), Hawaiian politician, lawyer, and bank president

See also
Cecil Browne (1896–1985), Canadian ice hockey player
Cecil Wyndham Browne, Anglican priest in Ireland